XJL may refer to:

 Columbia XJL, a large single-engined amphibian aircraft
 A long-wheelbase version of Jaguar XJ (X351), also known as XJL